Level 1 Entertainment LLC is an American film production company. It was founded in January 2003 by film producer Bill Todman, Jr. (the son of game show producer Bill Todman) and real estate and banking magnate Edward Milstein. Paul Schwake joined the company later that year as chief operating officer.

In 2006, Level 1 released their first film, the comedy Grandma's Boy, through 20th Century Fox and in collaboration with Adam Sandler's Happy Madison Productions. They again worked with Happy Madison on the comedy Strange Wilderness, which was released on February 1, 2008.

Level 1 also financed New Line Cinema's Rendition, starring Reese Witherspoon and Jake Gyllenhaal. They were initially a financial partner on Star Trek along with Paramount Pictures and J. J. Abrams' production company, Bad Robot, but were later replaced by Spyglass Entertainment.

Filmography

See also
 Caravan Pictures
 Spyglass Entertainment

References

External links
 Official website

Film production companies of the United States
Mass media companies established in 2003